George Montagu (28 July 1622 – July 1681) was an English politician who sat in the House of Commons  at various times between 1640 and 1679.

Montagu was born at Westminster, the son of Henry Montagu, 1st Earl of Manchester. He was at school in Amersham, Buckinghamshire, under Dr Croke and was admitted at Christ's College, Cambridge, on 21 March 1639. He was awarded MA in 1640 and admitted at the Middle Temple in the same year.

In November 1640, Montagu was elected Member of Parliament for Huntingdon in the Long Parliament and sat until 1648. 
 
In August 1660, Montagu was elected MP for Dover  in the Convention Parliament.  In 1661 he was re-elected MP for Dover in the Cavalier Parliament and sat until 1679. He was  Master of the Hospital of St Katharine-by-the-Tower, London, from 1661 to 1681.
 
Montagu died in 1681 and was buried at St Katharine-by-the-Tower in July.

Montagu married Elizabeth Irby, daughter of Sir Anthony Irby. His sons included Edward Montagu (MP), James Montagu (judge), Irby Montagu, MP and Charles Montagu, 1st Earl of Halifax.

References

External links
 findagrave.com burial record

1622 births
1681 deaths
Members of the Middle Temple
Alumni of Christ's College, Cambridge
People from Huntingdon
Members of the Parliament of England for Dover
English MPs 1640–1648
English MPs 1660
English MPs 1661–1679
George
Younger sons of earls